Bremen Zwei is a German, public radio station owned and operated by the Radio Bremen (RB).

References

Radio Bremen
Radio stations in Germany
Radio stations established in 2017
2017 establishments in Germany
Mass media in Bremen (city)